The full list of the 2008 FIFA Futsal World Cup goalscorers :

16 goals
 Pula

15 goals
 Falcão

11 goals
 Lenísio

10 goals
 Schumacher
 Damir Khamadiev

9 goals
 Vladislav Shayakhmetov

8 goals
 René Villalba
 Fabio Alcaraz
 Sirilo

7 goals
 Fernando Grana
 Dmitry Prudnikov
 Fernandão

6 goals
 Betão

5 goals
 Wilde
 Vinícius
 Eduardo Morales
 Mohammad Taheri
 Vahid Shamsaee
 Konstantin Maevskiy
 Valeriy Zamyatin

4 goals
 Marcelo Giménez
 Yosniel Mesa
 Ali Asghar Hassanzadeh
 Mohammad Hashemzadeh
 Patrick Nora
 Nobuya Osodo
 José Rotella
 Arnaldo Pereira
 Álvaro
 Daniel
 Javi Rodríguez
 Torras
 Sergiy Cheporniuk

3 goals
 Diego Giustozzi
 Matías Lucuix
 Ari
 Marquinho
 Ahmed El Agouz
 Carlos Estrada
 Erick Acevedo
 Adriano Foglia
 Saad Assis
 Yuki Kanayama
 Fernando Leitão
 Ildar Makayev
 Mykhaylo Romanov

2 goals
 Martín Amas
 Sebastián Corazza
 Gabriel
 Ciço
 Hu Jie
 Carlos Madrigal
 Yulier Olivera
 Martin Dlouhý
 Tomáš Sluka
 Mizo
 Daniel Tejada
 José González
 Masoud Daneshvar
 Mostafa Tayyebi
 Edgar Bertoni
 Marcio Forte
 Sandro Zanetti
 Mohammed Rahoma
 Rabie Abdel
 Kotaro Inaba
 Rodolfo Román
 Fernando Cardinal
 Konstantin Agapov
 Konstantin Dushkevich
 Elliot Ragomo
 Marcelo
 Eakapong Suratsawang
 Panuwat Janta
 Dmytro Ivanov
 Valeriy Legchanov
 Yevgen Rogachov

1 goal
 Esteban González
 Fernando Wilhelm
 Hernan Garcias
 Leandro Planas
 Carlinhos
 Liu Xinyi
 Zheng Tao
 Zhang Xi
 Boris Saname
 Jhonnet Martínez
 Yampier Rodríguez
 David Filinger
 Jan Janovský
 Marek Kopecký
 Michal Mareš
 Roman Mareš
 Zdeněk Sláma
 Abou El Komsan
 Ahmed Abou Serie
 Ramadan Samasry
 Sameh Saleh
 Estuardo de León
 Luis Castro
 Manuel Aristondo
 Marlon Noj
 Ebrahim Masoudi
 Fabiano Assad
 Kenichiro Kogure
 Kenta Fujii
 Yusuke Inada
 Yusuke Komiyama
 Fathi Al-Khoga
 Mohammed Shahout
 Yousef Mohammed

1 goal cont.
 Carlos Chilavert
 José Luis Santander
 Oscar Jara
 Robson Fernández
 Walter Villalba
 Jardel
 Bibi
 Gonçalo
 Israel
 Pedro Costa
 Ricardinho
 Marat Azizov
 Nikolay Pereverzev
 Ron Ginio
 Jack Wetney
 Micah Lea'alafa
 Borja
 Ortiz
 Luis Amado
 Lertchai Issarasuwipakorn
 Prasert Innui
 Sermphan Khumthinkaew
 Oleksandr Khursov
 Andy Rosenband
 Denison Cabral
 Mike Apple
 Pat Morris
 Sandre Naumoski
 Daniel Laurino
 Diego Garrido
 Mincho
 Jorge Rodríguez
 Juan Custódio
 Sebá

Own goals
 Hu Jie (for Ukraine)
 Yosniel Mesa (for Russia)
 Sameh Saleh (for Ukraine)
 Adriano Foglia (for Spain)
 Yoshifumi Maeda (for Solomon Islands)
 José Luis Santander (for Argentina)
 José Luis Santander (for Italy)
 Dmitry Prudnikov (for Brazil)
 Fedir Pylypiv (for Iran)

 

2008 FIFA Futsal World Cup